Suðureyri is a small Icelandic fishing village perched on the tip of the 13 km-long Súgandafjörður in the Westfjords.

The community was isolated for years by the huge mountains and rough road that led over them.  Now it is connected to Ísafjörður by a 5 km tunnel.

The village has tours set up to allow visitors to experience traditional Icelandic life firsthand.  This includes going out on original fishing boats or visiting the fish factory in town.

Amenities include a geothermal swimming pool, campsite, hotel and a restaurant. The church was built in 1937.

Climate

References

External links
 Fisherman Hotel Sudureyri 

Populated places in Westfjords
Fishing communities
Fishing communities in Iceland